Eric Ndizeye (born 23 August 1999) is a Burundian footballer who plays as a defender.

Career

Ndizeye started his career with Burundian side Musongati FC.

Before the second half of the 2020–21 season, he signed for Yeni Malatyaspor in the Turkish top flight. On 8 April 2021, Ndizeye debuted for Yeni Malatyaspor during a 1-1 draw with Fenerbahçe.

References

External links
 

1999 births
Living people
Burundian footballers
Burundi international footballers
Association football defenders
Yeni Malatyaspor footballers
Süper Lig players
Burundian expatriate footballers
Burundian expatriate sportspeople in Turkey
Expatriate footballers in Turkey